Paul Benson (June 1, 1918 – April 22, 2004) was a United States district judge of the United States District Court for the District of North Dakota.

Education and career

Born in Greenville Township, LaMoure County, North Dakota, Benson received a Bachelor of Science degree from the University of North Dakota in 1942 and was a lieutenant in the United States Navy during World War II, from 1942 to 1946. He received a Bachelor of Laws from George Washington University Law School in 1949, entering private practice in Cavalier, North Dakota in 1949 and in Grand Forks, North Dakota from 1950 to 1971. He was an assistant city attorney of Grand Forks from 1952 to 1954. He was the North Dakota Attorney General from 1954 to 1955. He was a lecturer at the University of North Dakota School of Law from 1960 to 1965.

Federal judicial service

On July 12, 1971, Benson was nominated by President Richard Nixon to a seat on the United States District Court for the District of North Dakota vacated by Judge Ronald Davies. Benson was confirmed by the United States Senate on July 29, 1971, and received his commission the same day. He served as Chief Judge from 1971 to 1985, assuming senior status on December 31, 1985. Benson served in that capacity until his death on April 22, 2004, in Verona, Wisconsin.

References

Sources
 

1918 births
2004 deaths
University of North Dakota alumni
George Washington University Law School alumni
People from LaMoure County, North Dakota
North Dakota Attorneys General
Judges of the United States District Court for the District of North Dakota
United States district court judges appointed by Richard Nixon
20th-century American judges
United States Navy officers